Romer Lake is a land-locked freshwater fjord at the northern end of King Frederick VIII Land, near Greenland's northeastern coast. The lake and its surroundings are part of the Northeast Greenland National Park zone.

Romer Lake was first mapped in 1933 by Lauge Koch during aerial surveys made during the 1931–34 Three-year Expedition to East Greenland (Treårsekspeditionen). It was likely named after the Danish Astronomer/Inventor Ole Rømer (1644–1710).

Geography
Romer Lake is located at the western end of the Crown Prince Christian Land peninsula to the west of the Princess Elizabeth Alps. A glacier has its terminus at the northern end and the Nunataami Elv river valley flows out of the southern end of the lake and, bending south through the valley known as Vandredalen, it discharges its waters in the northern inner arm of the Ingolf Sound of the Greenland Sea.

Elephant Foot Glacier

See also
List of fjords of Greenland

References

External links 

Report of environmental operation. Lead Dog 1960 - US Army Transportation Corps
Encyclopedia Arctica
Lakes of Greenland
Fjords of Greenland